Ralph George "Fat" Waldsmith (August 7, 1892 – June 7, 1925) was a professional football player during the early years of the National Football League. Waldsmith won an NFL championship with the Canton Bulldogs in 1922. before that season, he played for the Cleveland Indians in the American Professional Football Association, which was the run-up to the NFL.

Pre-NFL era
Prior to playing the NFL, Waldsmith played in the Ohio League with the Akron Indians in 1914, alongside Knute Rockne. He played in every game that season. In 1916 and 1917, Ralph won the Ohio League championship with the Canton Bulldogs. In 1919 Waldsmith was the coach and co-owner of the Akron Indians. That year, he signed Fritz Pollard to play for Akron ao that the team could compete against the Massillon Tigers and Canton.

Akron Zips Hall of Fame
In 1978, Waldsmith was inducted into the University of Akron's Varsity “A” Sports Hall of Fame.

References

 McClellan, Keith (1998). The Sunday Game: At the Dawn of Professional Football. Akron, OH: Akron University Press. .
 Carroll, John M. (1999). Fritz Pollard: Pioneer in Racial Advancement. University of Illinois Press. .

Notes

1892 births
1925 deaths
American football centers
American football guards
Akron Zips football players
Akron Indians (Ohio League) players
Akron Indians coaches
Canton Bulldogs players
Canton Bulldogs (Ohio League) players
Cleveland Indians (NFL) players
Players of American football from Akron, Ohio